Paula Stone (January 20, 1912 – December 23, 1997) was an American theater and motion pictures actress  from New York City.

Birth
She was the daughter of Fred Stone, a stage actor, dancing comedian, and owner of the Fred Stone theatrical stock company. Her mother, Allene Crater Stone, acted with her father and was a singer. The family had a ranch near Lyme, Connecticut, as well as a home in Forest Hills, Queens, New York.

Theater
Stone made her debut in May 1925, at the Illinois Theater in Chicago, Illinois, in Stepping Stones. She was 13 years old. Her sister Dorothy Stone made her stage debut at 16. Dorothy performed with Fred Stone at the Globe Theater in Manhattan in Criss-Cross in December 1926. Stone was then 14 and training to be a stage actress within two years. Her first ambition was to be a singer like her mother. Another sister, Carol, was 12. She also aspired to go into theater work.

Stone appeared with Fred and Dorothy in Ripples, a show which debuted in New Haven, Connecticut, in January 1930. The first New York show of the same production came at the New Amsterdam Theater in February. Stone and her father teamed in Smiling Faces, produced by the Shubert Theater owners in 1931. Mack Gordon and Harry Revel wrote the music and lyrics. The musical had its first night in Springfield, Massachusetts.

Stone toured in You Can't Take It With You, Idiots Delight, and other plays. In November 1940 she was cast with Marcy Wescott for the Dennis King musical show. It debuted at the Forrest Theater in Philadelphia, Pennsylvania.

When her husband was reported missing during World War II, Stone began doing camp and canteen shows with her father. The two joined again in a play produced by the Theatre Guild in September 1950.

Stone produced Sweethearts, Carnival in Flanders, Rumple, The Rain Prince and The Red Mill. She and Michael Sloane co-produced the Broadway musical Top Banana (1951).

Films
She signed with RKO Radio for a singing and dancing role in a musical in May 1935. Her second motion picture role features
her opposite Dick Foran in Treachery Rides The Range (1936), a Warner Bros. release. The movie sought to illustrate injustices perpetrated by buffalo traders against Cheyenne Indians. Foran and Stone provided the romantic interest. Her first motion picture paired her with William Boyd in Hopalong Cassidy (1935).

She had the role of Mabel, best friend of the leading lady Pearl, in The Girl Said No (1937). The movie was directed by Andrew L. Stone and received an Academy Award nomination. Her final motion picture was Laugh It Off (1939), a musical released by Universal Pictures.

Radio
Stone took singing lessons.  She was hired by WNEW in New York City, to broadcast the news and gossip of Broadway to servicemen. She wrote the scripts for this program and later secured her own show on the Mutual Radio Network called Leave It to the Girls, a program that would allow a panel of quick-witted women to discuss problems and issues sent in by listeners. Stone served as moderator, and Girls ran for four years on the Mutual network, finishing its run in 1949. In 1950 she hosted Hollywood USA. The show related entertainment news and she interviewed celebrities. On June 9, 1952, she debuted the Paula Stone Show on the Mutual Broadcasting System. She sought to mix her own knowledge of Hollywood people with interviews of celebrities, including Dennis Morgan, Johnnie Ray, Joan Crawford, Carlton Carpenter, and Debbie Reynolds.

Television
In 1954 Stone worked for Broadway Angels, Inc., in New York City. She was the MC of Angel Auditions, a television show which examined prospective
Broadway shows. The plays were tried in summer stock and considered for production on Broadway.

Marriage
Stone announced that she intended to marry cafe owner Walter Mason in 1937, but she did not. She wed orchestra leader Duke Daly (whose real name was Linwood A. Dingley), July 16, 1939 at the Wilshire Methodist Church in Los Angeles. Daly, 30, resided in Miami, Florida before moving to Beverly Hills in June 1939. He joined the Canadian RAF in January 1942 and flew many missions over Germany before he was killed in action on the return leg of a night-time bombing raid over Duisburg, Germany, May 13, 1943. Paula Stone later married Michael Sloane in 1946.

Paula Stone died in Sherman Oaks, California, in 1997.

Filmography

References

Notes

External links

Corbis page featuring some portraits of Paula Stone
Obscure Actresses

American stage actresses
American film actresses
American television actresses
Western (genre) film actresses
American female dancers
American radio actresses
Actresses from New York City
20th-century American actresses
1912 births
1997 deaths
20th-century American singers
20th-century American women singers
Dancers from New York (state)
20th-century American dancers